FC Bremerhaven was a German association football club located in Bremerhaven, Bremen.

History
The club was founded 1 June 1899 and soon merged with VfB 1899 Lehe to become FC Bremerhaven-Lehe. In 1917 FC merged with SC Sparta Bremerhaven to become Bremerhaven-Lehe SC Sparta until, in 1919, VfB left to resume play as a separate team.

After World War II occupying Allied authorities ordered the disbanding of most organizations in Germany, including sports and football clubs. A combined Bremerhaven side was formed late in 1945 as SG Lehe-Nord which was renamed ATS Bremerhaven in 1947. Two years later in 1949 SC Sparta Bremerhaven re-established an independent club out of ATS, followed by the re-establishment of VfB Lehe in 1953. ATS took on its original identity as FC Bremerhaven in 1992.

The club's best recent appearances have been in the Regionalliga Nord (III) in 1994–95 and 1999–2000 and in the Oberliga Niedersachsen/Bremen (IV) through the late 90s and in 2000–01 and 2002–03. They currently play in the Bremen-Liga (V), where they finished first in 2007–08 but were denied a Regionalliga licence.

The club was dissolved on 30 June 2012, its football section joined Sparta Bremerhaven, which continues to play in the Bremen-Liga.

Honours
The club's honours:
 Oberliga Niedersachsen/Bremen (IV)
 Runners-up: 1999
 Verbandsliga Bremen (IV-V)
 Champions: 1993, 1994, 2002, 2008
 Bremer Pokal
 Winners: 1996, 2005, 2006

References

External links
Abseits Guide to German Soccer

Football clubs in Germany
Defunct football clubs in Germany
Defunct football clubs in Bremen (state)
FC
Association football clubs established in 1899
1899 establishments in Germany
Association football clubs disestablished in 2012
2012 disestablishments in Germany
Sport in Bremerhaven